Flanagan's Shenanigans is a live album by pianist Tommy Flanagan recorded at a concert celebrating his award of the 1993 Jazzpar Prize and released on the Danish Storyville label.

Reception

Allmusic gave  the album 4 stars with Ken Dryden's review stating: "The pianist is always a treat to hear in a live setting, and this evening is no exception. ...As one of the relatively rare live recordings featuring Tommy Flanagan as a leader, this CD is warmly recommended".

Track listing
All compositions by Tommy Flanagan except where noted.
 "Eclypso" - 7:43
 "Beyond the Bluebird" - 8:13
 "Minor Mishap" - 6:49
 "For Lena and Lennie" (Quincy Jones) - 8:00
 "Flanagan's Shenangians" (James Williams) - 5:19
 "Balanced Scales" (Tom McIntosh) - 10:21
 "But Beautiful" (Jimmy Van Heusen, Johnny Burke) - 4:14
 "Let's" (Thad Jones) - 6:16
 "Tin Tin Deo" (Dizzy Gillespie, Gil Fuller, Chano Pozo) - 12:44

Personnel 
Tommy Flanagan - piano
Jesper Lundgaard - bass 
Lewis Nash - drums 
Jesper Thilo - tenor saxophone (tracks 1-4) 
Henrik Bolberg Pedersen - trumpet (tracks 1-3) 
Steen Hansen, Vincent Nilsson - trombone (tracks 1-3) 
Jan Zum Vohrde - alto saxophone, flute (tracks 1-3) 
Uffe Markussen - tenor saxophone, soprano saxophone, bass clarinet (tracks 1-3)
Flemming Madsen - baritone saxophone, bass clarinet (tracks 1-3)

References 

1995 live albums
Tommy Flanagan live albums
Storyville Records live albums